Elnias Šiauliai was a Lithuanian football club from Šiauliai.

History 

It was founded by Elnias leather and shoes factory. It was the most accomplished football club from Šiauliai during Soviet times. Elnias had the most wins (7) in Lithuanian SSR Top League (1945–1989).

Achievements 
Lithuanian SSR Top League
Winners (7): 1948, 1949, 1953, 1957, 1958, 1959–1960, 1960–1961
Runners-up (3): 1950, 1951, 1956
Third places (3): 1952, 1954, 1958–1959
Lithuanian Cup (Tiesa Cup):
Winners (3): 1950, 1957, 1959
Runners-up (1): 1951
 3rd place in Baltic Radio Cup Tournament (1958)

Managers 
 Voldemaras Jaškevičius, 1948–1953
 A. Sipavičius, 1955–1958
 I. Urbonas, 1958–1959
 V. Šambaris, 1959–1960
 S. Rostkauskas, 1961–1965
 H. Jakimavičius, 1966–1968
 R. Jankauskas, 1969–1986

External links 
Statistics – futbolinis.lt

Defunct football clubs in Lithuania
Sport in Šiauliai
1947 establishments in Lithuania
1986 disestablishments in Lithuania
Association football clubs established in 1947
Association football clubs disestablished in 1986